Fanni Pigniczki (born 23 January 2000) is a Hungarian rhythmic gymnast.

Personal life 
Fanni Pigniczki was born on 23 January 2000 in Budapest. Her grandfather is László Pigniczki, a World silver medalist in table tennis. She began rhythmic gymnastics when she was five years old.

Career 
She competed at the 2017 World Championships where she finished 32nd in the qualification round with a total score of 55.950.

She finished 16th in the all-around at the 2018 European Championships with a score of 64.220. She competed at the 2018 World Championships and finished 58th in the qualification round.

She competed for Hungary at the 2019 European Games where she finished 12th in the all-around final. At the 2019 World Championships, she competed with Blanka Boldizsar, Anna Juhasz, and Emma Juhasz and they finished 20th as a team. Pigniczki qualified for the all-around final where she finished 23rd with a score of 75.500.

She competed at the 2020 European Championships where she finished 11th in the All-around.

At the 2021 European Championships, Pigniczki qualified to the 2020 Summer Olympics, becoming the first Hungarian rhythmic gymnast to qualify to an Olympic Games since Viktória Fráter in 2000. At the Olympics, she finished twentieth in the qualification round for the individual all-around.

On August 28th 2022 Fanni became the first Hungarian gymnast to win a World Cup medal by winning bronze with ribbon in Cluji-Napoca.

Achievements 

 First Hungarian rhythmic gymnast to win a medal in an individual apparatus final at the FIG World Cup series.
 First Hungarian rhythmic gymnast to win a silver medal in an individual apparatus final at the FIG World Cup series.
 First Hungarian rhythmic gymnast to win a medal in an individual apparatus final at the World Games.

Routine music information

References 

2000 births
Living people
Hungarian rhythmic gymnasts
Sportspeople from Budapest
Competitors at the 2019 Summer Universiade
European Games competitors for Hungary
Gymnasts at the 2019 European Games
Olympic gymnasts of Hungary
Gymnasts at the 2020 Summer Olympics
Competitors at the 2022 World Games
World Games bronze medalists
21st-century Hungarian women